As an archipelago, the Philippines shares no land borders with any country, although the country claims a land border with Malaysia as a consequence of its territorial claims over the eastern portion of the Malaysian state of Sabah.

The maritime borders of the country are complicated by the South China Sea dispute and lack of delimitation agreements with Palau.

Maritime borders
The following are countries shares maritime borders with the Philippines.

References